Clifford Fanshawe Pember (1881–1955) was a British art director notable for his set designs in British cinema and theatre. Pember worked on films during the late silent and early sound eras. Pember originally trained as an architect. In 1928 he designed the sets for Alfred Hitchcock's film Easy Virtue, adapted from the play by Noël Coward. Along with Walter Murton, Pember has been identified as belonging to the "old school" of British set designers who resisted changes brought by new modernist influences (particularly by German immigrants).

Selected filmography
 Dawn (1928)
 Easy Virtue (1928)
 The Vortex (1928)
 The Triumph of the Scarlet Pimpernel (1928)
 The Woman in White (1929)
 Escape (1930)
 Birds of Prey (1930)
 Captain's Orders (1937)

References

Bibliography
 Bergfelder, Tim & Cargnelli, Christian. Destination London: German-speaking emigrés and British cinema, 1925-1950. Berghahn Books, 2008.

External links

1881 births
1955 deaths
British art directors
People from Kingston upon Thames